First on the Rope (French: Premier de cordée) is a 1944 French drama film directed by Louis Daquin and starring Irène Corday, André Le Gall and Lucien Blondeau.  It is an adaptation of the 1941 novel of the same title by Roger Frison-Roche. It was a faithful adaptation of the novel, which began shooting in June 1943 during the German Occupation of France. Despite being directed by Daquin, a French Communist, it was considered to demonstrate a Pétainist ideology possibly even containing elements of Nazism.

The film's sets were designed by the art director Lucien Aguettand. Location shooting took place around Mont Blanc in the French Alps.

Synopsis
The son of a veteran mountain climber succeeds his father as "the first on the rope", leading expeditions into the mountains. However, after nearly losing his life during a climb he develops vertigo and abandons his position to take over as a hotel manager. Two years later when his father is persuaded by a Norwegian tourist to take him on a trip into the mountains, his son is forced to come to their rescue when they run into a trouble during a storm.

Cast
 Irène Corday as Aline Lourtier
 André Le Gall as Pierre Servettaz
 Lucien Blondeau as Jean Servettaz
 Marcel Delaître as Ravanat dit 'Le Rouge'
 Jean Davy as 	Hubert de Vallon
 Maurice Baquet as 	Boule
 Mona Dol as Marie Servettaz
 Yves Furet as Georges à la Clarisse
 Andrée Clément as Suzanne Servettaz
 Geymond Vital as Maxime Vouillaz 
 Tosca De Lac as L'acrobate
 Louis Seigner as Le docteur
 Roger Blin as Paul Moury
 Eugène Chevalier as Un guide
 Guy Decomble as Warfield
 Jacques Dufilho as Fernand Lourtier
 Fernand René as Napoléon
 Albert Duvaleix as L'oncle Dechosalet 
 Jérôme Goulven as Un guide
 Jean-Marc Thibault as Un pensionnaire des Servettaz

References

Bibliography 
 Crisp, Colin. French Cinema—A Critical Filmography: Volume 2, 1940–1958. Indiana University Press, 2015.
 Nord, Philip. France's New Deal: From the Thirties to the Postwar Era. Princeton University Press, 2012.

External links 
 

1944 films
1944 drama films
French drama films
1940s French-language films
Films directed by Louis Daquin
Pathé films
1940s French films